Zagraj may refer to:

 Zagraj, the Slovenian name for the village of Sagrado, Italy
 Zagraj, Croatia, a village near Karlovac, Croatia